A Hudson's Bay point blanket is a type of wool blanket traded by the Hudson's Bay Company (HBC) in British North America, now Canada and the United States from 1779 to present. The blankets were typically traded to First Nations in exchange for beaver pelts as an important part of the North American fur trade. The blankets continue to be sold by Canada's Hudson's Bay department stores and have come to hold iconic status in the country.

History 

In the North American fur trade, by 1700, wool blankets accounted for more than 60 per cent of traded goods. French fur trader Germain Maugenest is thought to have advised the HBC to introduce point blankets.

Originally point blankets had a single stripe across each end, usually in blue or red. In the mid-1800s blankets began to be produced with a green stripe, red stripe, yellow stripe and indigo stripe on a white background; the four stripe colours were popular and easily produced using good colourfast dyes at that time. In 1798, a mill owner received a purchase order for "30 pair[s] of 3 points to be striped with four colors (red, blue, green, yellow) according to your judgement." to be manufactured in Witney, Oxfordshire, a town famous for its woollen blankets since the Middle Ages.

From the early days of the fur trade, wool blankets were made into hooded coats called capotes by both natives and French Canadian voyageurs, which were well-suited to Canada's cold winters.

Point system 
Points are short black lines woven into the selvage of the blanket along the edge just above the bottom set of stripes. About four inches in length (except in the case of half points, which are two inches), they indicate the finished overall size (area) of a blanket and allow easy determination of the size of a blanket - even when folded. French weavers invented the point system in the mid-1700s since then, as now, blankets were shrunk as part of the manufacturing process. The word point derives from the French empointer, meaning "to make threaded stitches on cloth".

Over the centuries the sizes of blankets have shifted, particularly during the twentieth century as beds became larger. Blankets of 2.5, 3, 3.5 and 4 point were most common during the fur-trade era. Today, Hudson's Bay blankets are commonly found in point sizes of 3.5 (twin bed), 4 (double), 6 (queen) and 8 (king).

The misconception persists that originally the points were an indication of a blanket's price in beaver pelts or even its weight. Thickness and quality are the same blanket to blanket, and a larger blanket will naturally weigh more.

Mackinaw jacket

In 1811, at Fort St. Joseph there was a shortage of greatcoats for the King's soldiers. The date was November 20, 1811 and British Army Captain Charles Roberts, wrote a letter to Captain Evans, Adjutant General in Quebec, making a requisition, written as follows:

Captain Roberts requisitioned HBC 3.5 point blankets from the British Indian Department to manufacture greatcoats for his troops.  John Askin Jr., a Métis and keeper of the King's stores at the fort, hired local women to design and manufactured forty woollen greatcoats.  Everyone was in agreement that the newly tailored greatcoats were of superior quality than the British Army standard issue greatcoats and helped to increase the morale of the King's soldiers.
  
At the beginning of the War of 1812, Roberts and his men occupied Fort Michilimackinac located at the present-day Mackinaw City, Michigan.  Roberts ordered a new supply of Hudson's Bay point blankets for the upcoming winter to manufacture more greatcoats.  This time Roberts had enlisted the aid of professional tailors and seamstresses to produce the greatcoats.

A despatch runner advised that the long length of the greatcoat was impractical for the deep snow drifts when travelling between Mackinaw and Montreal and requested it be replaced by the shorter double-breasted style, which became known as the Mackinaw jacket.  At first, the Mackinaw jacket was produced in blue and was later replaced by the more popular red and black tartan pattern.  The new design of the Mackinaw jacket was so beneficial for travelling through woods and trails that orders were received from people located from Fort William to Penetanguishene.

More than 100 years into the future, when the Hudson's Bay Company began to commercially sell point blanket coats the Mackinaw jacket remained popular with their customers.

Current use 
Versions of the blanket are available at Hudson's Bay stores throughout Canada. Solid colours are available, as is the classic pattern featuring the green, red, yellow, and indigo stripes. The blankets have always been made in England; today they are made by John Atkinson, a sub brand of A.W. Hainsworth & Sons Ltd.

Wools from Britain and New Zealand are used in the manufacture of blankets.

The official licensee allowed to import Hudson's Bay Blankets into the United States for commercial sale is Woolrich Inc. of Pennsylvania. Four U.S. retailers currently sell the blankets to consumers: Woolrich, L.L.Bean, Getz's Department Store in Marquette, Michigan and Johnson Woolen Mills.

Collectability 

Genuine point blankets have become very collectible and could fetch prices up to thousands of dollars. The main determinants of value include age, size, colour, pattern rarity and condition. Particularly collectible point blankets are the Coronation blankets: the one produced for the 1953 coronation of Queen Elizabeth II brings approximately $600 if in mint condition while examples of the even rarer 1937 Coronation blanket have sold for as high as $1300.

In 1890, HBC began adding labels to their blankets because point blankets of similar quality were being sold by HBC competitors from such manufacturers as Early's of Witney.

Harold Lee Tichenor, point blanket collector and consultant to Hudson's Bay Company, has written two books on point blankets and their collectibility.

In April 2017, HBC updated the label, rotating it from portrait to landscape, making it easy to display English and French on either side of the crest, which has been enhanced with red on the flag.  To celebrate Canada's 150th Anniversary in 2017, HBC added an additional label to the blanket: a picture of voyageurs in a canoe, with "Canada" printed at the top.

On 2 May 2020, HBC celebrated its 350th anniversary. It has re-released a series of special, limited-edition blankets in a variety of historic colourways and patterns. It added a 'Special Edition' label with a picture of the sailing vessel Nonsuch and the words 'Celebrating HBC's 350th Anniversary'.

 The Sky Blue Hudson's Bay Point Blanket - February
 The Camel Hudson's Bay Point Blanket - March
 The Ice Cream Hudson's Bay Point Blanket - April
 The 350th Commemorative Hudson's Bay Point Blanket (Grey) - May
 The Gold Hudson's Bay Point Blanket - June
 The Scarlet Hudson's Bay Point Blanket - July

Name in First Nations languages 
The Hudson's Bay blanket is called by different names in First Nations languages. Some examples are:
 , Haida language
  , Kwakʼwala
  , Kutenai language

References

Bibliography
 Bown, S. (2020). The Company: The Rise and Fall of the Hudson's Bay Empire. Anchor Canada. 
 Bryce, G. (1900). 1st ed. The Remarkable History of the Hudson's Bay Company.
 Forest, Alison and Jill Oakes. “The Blanket Coat: Unique Canadian Dress.” Canadian Home Economics Journal, 41 (3), Summer 1991, pp. 121-127.
 Hanson, C. “Some Additional Notes on Trade Blankets.” The Museum of the Fur Trade Quarterly, 24 (4), Winter 1988, pp. 5-11.
 Hudson’s Bay Point Blankets. Moccasin Telegraph, Spring 1963, pp. 10 & 15.
 Hudson’s Bay Point Blankets. Moccasin Telegraph, Summer 1979, pp. 60-61.
 Mackay, D. “Blanket Coverage.” The Beaver, June 1935, pp. 44-52.
 McIntosh, Andrew. "Blanket Statement — How a Canadian icon is woven into the country's shameful past". November 25, 2021. Ottawa Citizen.
 The Manufacturing Process of HBC Point Blankets. Moccasin Telegraph, Spring 1963, pp. 11-13.
 Olsen, S. (2010). Working with Wool: A Coast Salish Legacy and the Cowichan Sweater. Sono Nis Press. 
 Ostroff, J. (2017). How a Smallpox Epidemic Forged Modern British Columbia. Maclean's.
 Plummer, A., Early, R. E. (1969). The Blanket Makers, 1669-1969: A History of Charles Early & Marriott (Witney) Ltd. United Kingdom: Augustus M. Kelley. 
 Ross, Lester A. Hudson’s Bay Company Suppliers: An Illustrated Directory of British Commercial Suppliers who provided Manufacturers, Products and Provisions shipped to the Hudson’s Bay Company Columbia Department, 1821-52. Parks Canada, Manuscript Report Number 381, Volume 1.
 Rich, E.E., ed. McLouglin’s Fort Vancouver Letters, First Series, 1825-38. Volume IV, Hudson’s Bay Record Society, London, 1941.
 Rich, E.E., ed. McLoughlin’s Fort Vancouver Letters, Second Series, 1839-44. Volume VI, Hudson’s Bay Record Society, London, 1941.
 Swagerty, W.R. (2002). Indian Trade Blankets in the Pacific Northwest: History and Symbolism of a Unique North American Tradition. Columbia: The Magazine of Northwest History.
 Tichenor, H. (2002). The Blanket: An Illustrated History of the Hudson’s Bay Blanket A Quantum Book. 
 Tichenor, H.  (2002). The Collector's Guide to Point Blankets of the Hudson's Bay Company and Other Companies Trading in North America. Cinetel Film Productions Ltd.

External links 

 HBC Heritage - Our History - The HBC Point Blanket
 Government of Manitoba Archives: HBC Point Blankets
 The Point Blanket Site - Researcher and consultant Harold Tichenor provides valuable information about the history of the point blanket.
 Textile Museum of Canada - This short video provides more information about the Hudson’s Bay Point Blanket.
 Curriculum Services Canada. - Learn more about the HBC Point Blanket from this educational video.
 The Warm Blanket Story - includes an interview with Harold Tichenor.
 The Blanket Fund - 100% of Net Proceeds from the Sale of all HBC Point Blankets will go to Indigenous Peoples

Blankets
Canadian fashion
Fur trade
Hudson's Bay Company
Native American clothing
Western wear
Winter clothes